The following is a list of mobile telecommunications networks using third-generation Universal Mobile Telecommunications System (UMTS) technology. This list does not aim to cover all networks, but instead focuses on networks deployed on frequencies other than 2100 MHz which is commonly deployed around the globe and on Multiband deployments.

General information 
 For technical details on UMTS and a list of its designated operating frequencies, bands, and their common names, see UMTS frequency bands.
 Networks on the global UMTS-bands 1 and 8 are suitable for global roaming in ITU Regions 1, 2 (some countries) and 3.
 Networks on UMTS-bands 2 and 4 allow roaming in ITU Region 2 (Americas) only.
 Networks on UMTS band 5 are suitable for roaming in ITU Regions 2 and 3 (single countries).

Europe, Middle East & Africa (EMEA) 

Networks in Europe, the Middle East and Africa are exclusively deployed on 2100 MHz (Band 1) and/or 900 MHz (Band 8).

Americas

Caribbean

North America, Central America and South America 

Networks in this region are commonly deployed on 850 MHz (Band 5) and/or 1900 MHz (Band 2) unless denoted otherwise.

Asia & Oceania 

Networks in Asia are commonly deployed on 2100 MHz (Band 1) unless denoted otherwise.

Deployments in Japan

850 MHz (Band 5) / 900 MHz (Band 8) / 2100 MHz (Band 1) networks

See also 
 UMTS
 UMTS frequency bands
 List of LTE networks
 List of CDMA2000 networks

References 

UMTS
Lists by country
Telecommunications lists